Bogolyubov or Boholyubov is a surname in Russia and Ukraine, meaning "he who loves God" or, possibly "he who is loved by God". Spellings Bogoljubov and Bogoliubov are also used. The feminine form is Bogolyubova. The following persons have this surname:

Alexey Bogolyubov (1824–1896), Russian landscape painter
Ārons Bogoļubovs (born 1938), Soviet Olympic medalist judoka
Efim Bogoljubov (1889–1952), Ukrainian-German chess Grandmaster
Gennadiy Bogolyubov (born 1961/1962), a London-based Ukrainian billionaire
Nikolay Bogolyubov (1909–1992), Russian theoretical physicist and mathematician
Nikolay Bogolyubov (actor) (1899–1980), Russian actor

Russian-language surnames